William Henry Hudson (4 August 1841 – 18 August 1922) – known in Argentina as Guillermo Enrique Hudson –  was an Anglo-Argentine author, naturalist and ornithologist.

Life

Hudson was the son of Daniel Hudson and his wife Catherine, United States settlers of English and Irish origin. He was born and lived his first years in a small estancia called "25 Ombues" in what is now Ingeniero Allan, Florencio Varela, Argentina.

In 1846 the family established a pulpería further south, in the surroundings of Chascomús, not far from the lake of the same name. In this natural environment, Hudson spent his youth studying the local flora and fauna and observing both natural and human dramas on what was then a lawless frontier, while publishing his ornithological work in Proceedings of the Royal Zoological Society initially in an English mingled with Spanish idioms. He had a special love for Patagonia.

Hudson emigrated to England in 1874, taking up residence at St Luke's Road in Bayswater, where he continued to live for most of his life; in 1876 he married his landlady, the former singer Emily Wingrave, in Kensington, London. One of the daughters of John Hanmer Wingrave, she was some eleven years older than Hudson, having been born on 22 December 1829. He supported himself as a writer and journalist; the couple had no children. Hudson himself was naturalized as a British subject on 4 July 1900.

Hudson was a friend of the late-19th century English author George Gissing, whom he met in 1889. They corresponded until the latter's death in 1903, occasionally exchanging their publications, discussing literary and scientific matters, and commenting on their respective access to books and newspapers, a matter of supreme importance to Gissing.<ref>Shrubsall, Dennis and Pierre Coustillas eds. Landscape and literati: unpublished letters of W. H. Hudson and George Gissing. Salisbury: Michael Russell, 1985. Also various references in Coustillas, Pierre ed.London and the Life of Literature in Late Victorian England: the Diary of George Gissing. Brighton: Harvester Press, 1978.</ref>

In 1911 Emily Hudson became an invalid and moved to Worthing in Sussex. After that, Hudson lived apart from her "for reasons of his own health", although it is clear from their abundant surviving correspondence that he visited her frequently and they remained on affectionate terms.

Hudson died on 18 August 1922, at 40, St Luke’s Road, Westbourne Park, Bayswater, and was buried in Broadwater and Worthing Cemetery, Worthing, on 22 August 1922, next to his wife, who had died early in 1921.

Hudson left an estate valued at £8225, and his Executors were the publisher Ernest Bell and Wynnard Hooper, a journalist.

Books
He produced a series of ornithological studies, including Argentine Ornithology (1888–1899) and British Birds (1895), and later achieved fame with his books on the English countryside, including Hampshire Days (1903), Afoot in England (1909) and A Shepherd's Life (1910), which helped foster the back-to-nature movement of the 1920s and 1930s and was set in Wiltshire.

Hudson's best-known novel is Green Mansions (1904), which was adapted into a a film starring Audrey Hepburn and Anthony Perkins, and his best-known non-fiction is Far Away and Long Ago (1918), which was also made into a film.

Scientific views
Hudson was an advocate of Lamarckian evolution. He was a critic of Darwinism and defended vitalism. He was influenced by the non-Darwinian evolutionary writings of Samuel Butler.Miller, David. (1990). W. H. Hudson and the Elusive Paradise. Palgrave Macmillan. pp. 78–82.  He was an early member of the Royal Society for the Protection of Birds.

Recognition and awards

The Hudson Memorial Bird Sanctuary in Hyde Park, London includes a carved stone memorial by Sir Jacob Epstein representing Rima, the child goddess of nature, who featured in Hudson's novel Green Mansions. The engravings are by the designer Eric Gill.

Ernest Hemingway referred to Hudson's The Purple Land (1885) in his novel The Sun Also Rises, and to Far Away and Long Ago in his posthumous novel The Garden of Eden (1986). He listed Far Away and Long Ago in a suggested reading list for a young writer.

James Rebanks' 2015 book The Shepherd's Life about a Lake District farmer was inspired by Hudson's work of the same name: "But even more than Orwell or Hemingway, W.H. Hudson turned me into a book obsessive ..." (p. 115), and: "One day, I pulled A Shepherd's Life by W.H. Hudson from the bookcase ...and the sudden life-changing realization it gave me that we could be in books – great books." (p. 114)

In Argentina, Hudson is considered to belong to the national literature as Guillermo Enrique Hudson, the Spanish version of his name. A town in Berazategui Partido and several other public places and institutions are named after him. The town of Hudson in Buenos Aires Province is named for him.

WorksThe Purple Land that England Lost: Travels and Adventures in the Banda Oriental, South America (1885)A Crystal Age (1887)Argentine Ornithology (1888)Fan–The Story of a Young Girl's Life (1892), as Henry Harford
The Naturalist in la Plata (1892)
Idle Days in Patagonia (1893)
Birds in a Village (1893)Lost British Birds (1894), pamphletBritish Birds (1895), with a chapter by Frank Evers BeddardOsprey; or, Egrets and Aigrettes (1896)Birds in London (1898)Nature in Downland (1900)Birds and Man (1901)El Ombú (1902), stories; later South American SketchesHampshire Days (1903)Green Mansions: A Romance of the Tropical Forest (1904)A Little Boy Lost (1905)Land's End. A Naturalist's Impressions in West Cornwall (1908)Afoot in England (1909)A Shepherd's Life: Impressions of the South Wiltshire Downs (1910)
Adventures Among Birds (1913)Tales of the Pampas (1916)Far Away and Long Ago – A History of My Early Life (1918; new edition by Eland, 2005)The Book of a Naturalist (1919)Birds in Town and Village (1919)Birds of La Plata (1920) two volumesDead Man's Plack and An Old Thorn (1920) – see Dead Man's PlackA Traveller in Little Things (1921)Tired Traveller (1921), essaySeagulls in London. Why They Took To Coming To Town (1922), essayA Hind in Richmond Park (1922)The Collected Works (1922–23), 24 volumes153 Letters from W.H. Hudson (1923), edited by Edward GarnettRare Vanishing & Lost British Birds (1923)Ralph Herne (1923)Men, Books and Birds (1925)The Disappointed Squirrel (1925) from The Book of a NaturalistMary's Little Lamb (1929)South American Romances (1930) The Purple Land; Green Mansions; El OmbúW.H. Hudson's Letters to R. B. Cunninghame Graham (Golden Cockerel Press 1941; about R. B. Cunninghame Graham)Tales of the Gauchos (1946)Letters on the Ornithology of Buenos Ayres (1951), edited by David W. DewarDiary Concerning his Voyage from Buenos Aires to Southampton on the Ebro (1958)Gauchos of the Pampas and Their Horses (1963), stories, with R.B. Cunninghame GrahamEnglish Birds and Green Places: Selected Writings (1964) Birds of A Feather: Unpublished Letters of W.H. Hudson (1981), edited by D. ShrubsallLandscapes and Literati: Unpublished letters of W.H. Hudson and George Gissing (1985), edited by Dennis Shrubsall and Pierre Coustillas

Bibliographies
 G. F. Wilson (1922, 1968) Bibliography of the Writings of W.H. Hudson John R. Payne (1977) W.H. Hudson. a BibliographyBiographies
 Morley Roberts (1924) W.H. Hudson Ford Madox Ford (1937) Portraits from Life Robert Hamilton (1946) W.H. Hudson:The Vision of Earth Richard E. Haymaker (1954) From Pampas to Hedgerows and Downs: A Study of W. H. Hudson Alicia Jurado (1971) Vida y obra de W.H. Hudson John T. Frederick (1972) William Henry Hudson D. Shrubsall (1978) W.H. Hudson, Writer and Naturalist Ruth Tomalin (1982) W.H. Hudson – a biography Amy D. Ronner (1986) W.H. Hudson: The Man, The Novelist, The Naturalist David Miller (1990) W.H. Hudson and the Elusive Paradise Felipe Arocena (2003) William Henry Hudson: Life, Literature and Science Jason Wilson: Living in the sound of the wind'', [A Personal Quest For W. H. Hudson, Naturalist And Writer From The River Plate], London : Constable, 2016

Notes

References

External links

 
 
 
 Tales of the Pampas (El Ombú and Other Stories), illustrated 1939.
 
Reserva Hudson
Archival Material at  

 
 The Papers of William Henry Hudson at Dartmouth College Library

1841 births
1922 deaths
19th-century Argentine writers
19th-century English novelists
20th-century Argentine male writers
20th-century English novelists
Argentine male novelists
Argentine ornithologists
Argentine emigrants to England
Argentine naturalists
Argentine people of American descent
Argentine people of English descent
Argentine people of Irish descent
English ornithologists
English people of American descent
English people of Irish descent
Lamarckism
People from Quilmes
Victorian novelists
Vitalists